Nuclear distribution protein nudE homolog 1 is a protein that in humans is encoded by the NDE1 gene.

Clinical significance 
Mutations in both copies of NDE1 cause microlissencephaly type 4.

References

Further reading

Human proteins